UnCabaret is a Los Angeles-based alternative comedy company that produces live, TV and web projects.

History
UnCabaret was created by performance artist-turned comedian Beth Lapides whose frustration with the comedy club scene of the late 1980s in the Los Angeles lead her to seek 'a better way'. She began producing shows in 'alternative' venues and in 1988, with writer-producer Greg Miller, launched UnCabaret at The Women's Building.

In November 1993, UnCabaret was booked for three nights at LunaPark, a new music club in West Hollywood. Every Sunday night for the next seven years, Beth gathered a group of performers culled from the very best and brightest comedians, including Patton Oswalt, Judy Toll, Taylor Negron, Bob Odenkirk, Julia Sweeney, Bobcat Goldthwait, Terry Sweeney, Merrill Markoe, Janeane Garofalo, David Cross, Laura Kightlinger, Andy Kindler, Dana Gould, Kathy Griffin, Andy Dick, Margaret Cho,  Michael Patrick King, to develop an idiosyncratic story based form of stand-up. The idea of the show was to be funny without doing an 'act' and use story-based stream-of-consciousness techniques rather than the set-up and punchline formula of mainstream standup.

Traditional comedians dismissed UnCabaret for its lack of structure and formal technique, but the show drew a rabid cult following and influenced many other 'alternative comedy' shows in Los Angeles, then New York and eventually throughout the country and Canada.

In 1997, Comedy Central produced an UnCabaret TV special hosted by Beth Lapides and featuring Taylor Negron, Dana Gould, Julia Sweeney, Kathy Griffin, Andy Dick and Scott Thompson.

When LunaPark closed, UnCabaret moved to the HBO Workspace (where they developed the show with Warner Bros), then to The Knitting Factory and M-Bar always continuing to  produce personal narrative comedy with an expanding group of non-traditional comedians Sklar Brothers, Patton Oswalt, Greg Behrendt, Jeff Garlin, Mike McDonald, plus writers like Jerry Stahl, Michael Patrick King, Larry Charles, Judd Apatow, John Riggi and others.

UnCabaret went on an extended hiatus in 2008. In 2012, Beth brought UnCabaret back. Teaming up with Musical Director and producer Mitch Kaplan, Beth refined the show, and began to mix a new crop of comedians with many of the performers who had constituted UnCabaret in its previous incarnations. Among the musicians and comedians who have appeared at First and Hope are Sarah Silverman, Roseanne Barr, Sandra Bernhard, Tig Notaro, Rory Scovel, Kyle Kinane, Tim Bagley, Michaela Watkins, Laura Kightlinger, Jackie Kashian, Byron Bowers, Moshe Kasher, Miss Coco Peru, Rebecca Corry, Moon Zappa, Natasha Leggero, Michelle Lee, Rae Dawn Chong, Andy Kindler, Eddie Pepitone, Marc Maron, Kurt Braunohler,  Jennifer Coolidge, Jen Kirkman, Julie Goldman, Lauren Weedman, Allee Willis, Missi Pyle, Sam Pancake, Drew Droege, Karen Kilgariff, Greg Behrendt, Rob Delaney, Jill Sobule, Kelly Carlin, Ruby Friedman, Ben Gleib, Abby Travis, Lynda Kay, conniekim, Richard Chamberlain, and Kelly Mantle.

Television and film
Four Episodes produced for Amazon, 2012
Executive Producers: Beth Lapides, Mitch Kaplan, Adam Salky
Episode 1: Greg Behrendt, Sandra Bernhard, Rob Delaney, Andy Dick, Karen Kilgariff, Alec Mapa
Episode 2: Margaret Cho, Dana Gould, Taylor Negron, Tig Notaro, Garfunkel and Oates
Episode 3: Greg Fitzsimmons, Jen Kirkman, Garfunkel and Oates, Greg Proops, Kira Soltanovich
Episode 4: Carlie and Doni, Selene Luna, Rory Scovel, The Sklar Brothers, Casey Wilson
Comedy Central Special, 1997

Other projects
UnCabaret produces a spoken-word comedy show, "Say the Word", which features original first-person stories from TV comedy writers including Cindy Chupack, Jay Kogen, Winnie Holzman, Alan Zweibel, Peter Mehlman, Merrill Markoe, Kevin Nealon and others.

UnCabaret also produced The Other Network, a festival of un-aired TV pilots introduced by their creators, including Robert Smigel, Conan O'Brien, Bob Odenkirk, Judd Apatow and others.

Radio and audio
100 episodes of "Radio UnCabaret" for Comedy World and Sirius Satellite Radio. 2000-2001

UnCabaret has been featured on “This American Life”, “All Things Considered”, “Morning Edition” and “Marketplace” on NPR.

Several compilation CDs including "Freak Weather Feels Different", "The Un & Only", "The Good, the Bad and the Drugly" and "Play the Word (vol. 1 & 2)".

Podcasts are now heard on Audible.com/uncabaret.

Classes
UnCabaret founder Beth Lapides leads a workshop in personal narrative techniques for writers, performers and other humans, The Comedian's Way. She teaches privately in Los Angeles, and has taught at UCLA Extension, Humber College, CalArts, Media Bistro and at Kripalu Center for Yoga and Health.

References

External links

American comedy troupes
Improvisational troupes
Culture of Hollywood, Los Angeles
Landmarks in Los Angeles